Edward Peter Foster (March 21, 1896 – June 9, 1962) was a provincial politician from Alberta, Canada. He served as a member of the Legislative Assembly of Alberta from 1935 to 1940, sitting with the Social Credit caucus in government.

References

Alberta Social Credit Party MLAs
People from Guelph
1962 deaths
1896 births